The Vortex is a 1928 British drama film directed by Adrian Brunel and starring Ivor Novello, Willette Kershaw and Simeon Stuart. It was an adaptation of the Noël Coward play The Vortex and was made by Gainsborough Studios. The film's sets were designed by Clifford Pember.

Cast
 Ivor Novello - Nicky Lancaster
 Willette Kershaw - Florence Lancaster
 Frances Doble - Bunty Mainwaring
 Alan Hollis - Tom Veryan
 Simeon Stuart - David Lancaster
 Kinsey Peile - Pouncefort Quentin
 Julie Suedo - Anna Vollof
 Dorothy Fane - Helen Saville

References

External links

1928 films
1928 drama films
Films directed by Adrian Brunel
British drama films
British silent feature films
British black-and-white films
1920s English-language films
1920s British films
Silent drama films